The University of Tennessee Southern (UT-Southern, formerly Martin Methodist College) is a public college in Pulaski, Tennessee. Founded in 1870, for over 150 years it was a private institution until joining the University of Tennessee system in 2021. For many years it was a junior college but is now a baccalaureate institution providing more than thirty academic majors. The college also has an MBA program.

History
UT Southern was originally founded as Martin Methodist College in 1870. The college was named for Thomas Martin (1799–1870), former mayor of Pulaski and Ku Klux Klan founder, who left in his will an endowment of $30,000 to establish a college for the education of the white girls and women of Giles County. It is sometimes suggested that Martin did so in fulfilment of a promise to his daughter Victoria, who died at the age of twenty. In 1938, the college became coeducational. Originally founded as a whites-only institution, in 1966 it became racially integrated. The college was originally named Martin Female College; in 1908, its name was changed to Martin College; in April 1986, its name was changed to its final name as a private institution of Martin Methodist College.

The college joined the University of Tennessee system in 2021.  When it joined the system, it was renamed UT Southern and became the first new primary campus in the University of Tennessee System in over 50 years. The former president of the college, Mark La Branche, remained as chancellor of the campus. The name University of Tennessee-Southern was chosen because the campus serves the 13 counties of southern Middle Tennessee.

Athletics
The Tennessee–Southern (UT Southern) athletic teams are called the FireHawks (previously they were known as the RedHawks before the UT system merger). The university is a member of the National Association of Intercollegiate Athletics (NAIA), primarily competing in the Mid-South Conference (MSC) since the 2020–21 academic year. The FireHawks (back then the Martin Methodist RedHawks) previously competed in the Southern States Athletic Conference (SSAC; formerly known as Georgia–Alabama–Carolina Conference (GACC) until after the 2003–04 school year) from 2013–14 to 2019–20 (to which the school will return in 2023–24); and in the defunct TranSouth Athletic Conference (TranSouth or TSAC) from 1996–97 to 2012–13 (when the conference dissolved); and in the Tennessee Collegiate Athletic Conference (TCAC) from 1986–87 to 1995–96.

UT Southern competes in 19 intercollegiate varsity sports: Men's sports include baseball, basketball, bowling, cross country, golf, soccer, swimming and tennis; while women's sports include basketball, bowling, cross country, golf, soccer, softball, swimming, tennis and volleyball. Competitive cheerleading is offered as a co-ed sport. Competitive trap and skeet shooting was added as the department's 15th varsity sport in the fall of 2013.

Accomplishments
Some of the sport teams' accomplishments include:

  Women's Soccer – Three-time NAIA National Champions (2005, 2007, 2021). Nine consecutive TranSouth Athletic Conference championships (2004–2012), nine consecutive NAIA National Tournament berths (2004–2012), 24 NAIA All-Americans and the 2005 and 2007 NAIA Player of the Year awards.
  Men's Soccer – On Dec. 7, 2013, the FireHawks defeated Auburn University at Montgomery 2–1 in overtime to claim the program's first ever NAIA national championship. Despite entering the 32-team tournament as the lowest seeded squad, the FireHawks vanquished some of the NAIA's premier competition to claim the title. In their opening-round matchup, the FireHawks avenged an early season loss with a 2–0 victory over Bryan College. In the second round, the FireHawks thrashed No. 1 overall seed Grand View University 5–0, highlighted by a second half natural hat trick from eventual tournament Offensive Most Outstanding Player Sean Dong. In their quarterfinal matchup, the FireHawks knocked off defending national champion Belhaven University 2–1 in double overtime. The victory marked the third time in 2013 the FireHawks had beaten the defending national champion Blazers. The FireHawks also defeated the Blazers 1–0 to claim the 2013 Southern States Athletic Conference Championship a month prior. In the national tournament semifinal, the FireHawks scored with just under four minutes left in regulation to force overtime against Ashford University before ultimately advancing in a penalty kick shootout. FireHawk goalkeeper Stephen Lunney, who was named the tournament's Most Outstanding Defensive Player, made a stop on the second Ashford penalty before taking and making the fifth and final penalty to send the FireHawks to the tournament final. In the title match, the FireHawks struck for an early goal against Auburn University at Montgomery, but allowed a second half goal from the Warhawks. In overtime, FireHawk midfielder Jonathan Remond took a pass from Kenneth Monge just outside the Warhawk box and finessed a left-footed shot into the back of the net to give the FireHawks the national title.

References

External links
 Official website
 Official athletics website

 
Public universities and colleges in Tennessee
Educational institutions established in 1870
Universities and colleges accredited by the Southern Association of Colleges and Schools
Education in Giles County, Tennessee
Buildings and structures in Giles County, Tennessee
Tennessee Southern
1870 establishments in Tennessee
Southern